Alexandrovka is a rural locality (a selo) in Nemetsky National District, Altai Krai, Russia. The population was 215 as of 2013.

Geography 
Alexandrovka is located 17 km northeast of Galbshtadt (the district's administrative centre) by road. Orlovo is the nearest rural locality.

References 

Rural localities in Nemetsky National District